Dhari Devi  a Hindu temple located on the banks of the Alaknanda River between Srinagar and Rudraprayag in the Garhwal Region of Uttarakhand, India. The temple is home to the upper half of the idol of the goddess Dhari, while the lower half of the idol is located in Kalimath, where she is worshipped as a manifestation of the Goddess Kali. 

She is considered to be the guardian deity of Uttarakhand and is revered as the protector of the Char Dham’s. Her shrine is one of 108 Shakti Sthals in India, as numbered by Srimad Devi Bhagwat.

2013 Uttarakhand floods

On June 16, 2013 the original temple of the goddess was removed and shifted to the concrete platform at a height of about 611 metres from the Alaknanda river, to give way to the construction of the 330 MW Alaknanda Hydro Electric Dam built by Alaknanda Hydro Power Company Ltd (AHPCL), a subsidiary of infrastructure major.

Incidentally, Hours after the idol was moved, the region faced what would become one of the country’s worst natural disasters since the 2004 tsunami. The 2013 North India floods were caused by a multi-day cloudburst resulting in devastating floods and landslides washing away the entire shrine town and killing hundreds of people. Locals and devotees believe, Uttarakhand had to face the Goddess’ ire as she was shifted from her ‘mool sthan’ (original abode) to make way for a 330 MW hydel project that was left in ruins after the flood. A similar attempt in 1882 by a local king had resulted in a landslide that had flattened Kedarnath.

The new temple is now constructed at its original location.

References

Hindu temples in Uttarakhand
Rudraprayag district
Shakti temples

External links
 Dhari Devi Temple - Uttarakhand